Creepshow is a 1982 American horror comedy anthology film  directed by George A. Romero and written by Stephen King, making this film his screenwriting debut. The film's ensemble cast includes Hal Holbrook, Adrienne Barbeau, Fritz Weaver, Leslie Nielsen, Carrie Nye, E. G. Marshall, and Viveca Lindfors as well as King himself. The film was primarily shot on location in Pittsburgh and its suburbs, including Monroeville, where Romero leased an old boys academy (Penn Hall) to build extensive sets for the film.

Creepshow consists of five short stories: "Father's Day", "The Lonesome Death of Jordy Verrill" (based on the King short story "Weeds"), "Something to Tide You Over", "The Crate" and "They're Creeping Up on You!" Two of these stories were adapted from King's short stories, with the film bookended by prologue and epilogue scenes featuring a young boy named Billy (played by King's son, Joe), who is punished by his abusive father for reading horror comics.

Creepshow is an homage to the EC horror comics of the 1950s, such as Tales from the Crypt, The Vault of Horror and The Haunt of Fear. In order for the film to give viewers a comic book feel, Romero hired long-time effects specialist Tom Savini to replicate comic-like effects.

The film earned $21 million in the United States. It was followed by a 1987 sequel, Creepshow 2, directed by the first film's cinematographer, Michael Gornick, written by Romero and based on stories by King. A second sequel, Creepshow 3, was released in 2006, without involvement from either Romero or King.

Plot

Prologue
Billy Hopkins, a young boy, gets disciplined by his abusive father Stan for reading Creepshow, a horror comic. Not wanting his son to be exposed to the comic's content, Stan throws it in the garbage. As Billy sits upstairs, wishing that his father rots in Hell, he hears a sound at the window.

The source of the noise turns out to be the Creep, the host of the comic book, who beckons him to come closer and removes the trash can's lid.

"Father's Day"
Sylvia Grantham meets her nephew Richard and niece Cass, along with Cass's new husband Hank Blaine at the Grantham estate for the family's annual dinner on the third Sunday in June. They proceed to tell Hank about the family matriarch, Great Aunt Bedelia, and of how it is an open secret in the family that she murdered her late father: the miserly and domineering Nathan Grantham who had accumulated the family's fortune through bootlegging, fraud, extortion, and murder-for-hire.

Many years earlier, Bedelia was rendered an unstable spinster, the result of a lifetime spent putting up with her father's incessant demands and emotional abuse, which got even worse after he suffered a stroke and she was made to nurse him full-time. The torture culminated with Nathan orchestrating a fatal "hunting accident", which took the life of his daughter's fiancé Peter Yarbro, in order to keep her under his thumb. That Father's Day, Bedelia, driven into a murderous rage by Nathan's constant insults and his petulant demands for his cake, bashed her overbearing father's head in with a marble ashtray (that is hidden throughout the other stories).

In the present day, Bedelia arrives at Grantham Manor that evening. She stops by the family cemetery, just outside the mansion, to lay a flower at her father's grave. She drunkenly reminisces about the murder, and reveals that Sylvia staged the killing as an accident in order to steal and distribute Nathan's fortune among the rest of the family. She accidentally spills her whiskey bottle in front of the headstone. Just then, Nathan's reanimated, putrefied, maggot-infested corpse emerges from the burial plot, still demanding the Father's Day cake he never got. He avenges himself on Bedelia, strangling her. He proceeds to systematically wipe out the rest of his family: telekinetically crushing Hank to death with a gravestone, then twisting Sylvia's neck; he also kills Mrs. Danvers, the Granthams' cook, possibly to cover his tracks. As a gruesome final joke, Nathan surprises Cass and Richard by presenting them with his Father's Day cake: Sylvia's severed head, covered with frosting and lit candles.

While the ending is left ambiguous in the film, with Nathan gloating over a terrified Cass and Richard in freeze-frame, the comic book based on the film has the Creep giving a vague hint that Nathan's next act was to "blow out their candles".

"The Lonesome Death of Jordy Verrill"
Jordy Verrill, a comedic and dim-witted backwoods yokel played by Stephen King, watches as a meteorite crash lands on his farm. Observing the crash site, Jordy gets his fingers burned when he tries to touch the meteorite. In a fantasy sequence, Jordy imagines selling the meteorite to the local college's "Department of Meteors", hoping that the sale will provide enough money to pay off a $200 bank loan. Taking precautions, he douses the meteorite with a bucket of water, causing it to crack open and spill a glowing blue liquid. In another fantasy sequence, Jordy imagines the "Department of Meteors" refusing to purchase the now broken meteorite. Resolving to try and glue the halves together in the morning, Jordy nonchalantly dumps the liquid inside the meteor into the soil, but not before the substance makes contact with his skin.

As time passes, Jordy finds his fingers being overcome by what appears to be grass. He attempts to call a doctor, but he reconsiders doing so when he imagines (in another fantasy sequence) that the doctor will chop the afflicted fingers off without anesthetic. Over time, the strange substance continue to grow all over Jordy's farm, everything Jordy has touched, and even on Jordy's body, which causes him to itch furiously. Jordy panics as he discovers the increasing growth, and tries to calm himself by pouring himself a bottle of vodka and mixing it with orange juice. Soon after, Jordy falls asleep in a drunken stupor.

Jordy wakes up sometime later, believing the experience to have been a dream, but his hopes are dashed when he sees that the plant growth has managed to reach inside the house, as well as discovering in a mirror that he has now grown a green beard. He starts to draw a bath to relieve the itching, but he is visited by the ghost of his deceased father, who appears in his mirror and warns him against doing so by telling him that water is what the plants want. Grimly rationalizing that not getting in would only delay the inevitable, Jordy laments that "[he's] a goner already." When the itching from the growth on his skin becomes unbearable, Jordy succumbs to temptation and collapses into the bathwater.

The next morning, Jordy's farm has been completely coated with dense layers of the alien vegetation, with Jordy himself transformed into a human-shaped collection of plant matter. In despair, he reaches for a Coach Gun, prays to God that his luck will be in just this once, and blows the top of his head off, killing himself. Immediately afterwards, a TV weather forecast announces that moderate temperatures and heavy rains are predicted, the implication being that this will accelerate the spread of the extraterrestrial plant growth to surrounding areas, and will continue to the point where the Earth may be terraformed into an entirely green planet.

"Something to Tide You Over"
Richard Vickers is a vicious and heartless millionaire whose spry jocularity belies his cold-blooded and murderous nature. He visits Harry Wentworth, the man with whom his wife Becky is having an affair. Richard mentions that he and Becky never shared any actual affection, but such is beside the issue; Richard's point of honor is always keeping what's "his", a rule that he enforces no matter what. Rather than physically assault Harry, Richard plays a recording of Becky's voice, where she tearfully begs Harry to help her. Both men travel to Comfort Point, Richard's isolated beach house. Richard points out what appears to be a burial mound in the sand. When Harry promptly runs to it, Richard pulls a gun on him. He forces Harry to jump into the empty hole and begin burying himself.

Eventually, Richard finishes burying Harry neck-deep in the sand below the high-tide line. Richard then sets up a closed-circuit TV camera and a VCR to record Harry. He also brings along a monitor displaying Becky, who is also buried up to her neck further down the beach, where the rising tide is already washing over her face. Richard does tell Harry that he and Becky have a chance of survival: if they can hold their breath long enough for the sand to loosen once the seawater covers them, they can break free and escape. With that, Richard abandons Harry and returns to Comfort Point. Sipping a cocktail, Richard watches with great satisfaction as Harry and Becky slowly drown. Just before Harry is completely submerged by the advancing tide, he looks directly into the camera and vows revenge on Richard.

Hours later, Richard returns to Harry's "grave" to collect the tape. He finds the ruined monitor, but no sign of Harry. Not disturbed, Richard writes this off as the body having been carried away by the current. Later that night, Richard hears voices calling his name, as a mysterious unseen presence easily bypasses Comfort Point's extensive security system. The culprits turn out to be Harry and Becky, the two lovers having returned as waterlogged, seaweed-covered revenants intent on revenge on their killer. Richard shoots them, but when the bullets have no effect, he barricades himself in his bedroom, only to find Becky and Harry already inside. The two victims taunt Richard, who laughs insanely.

Sometime later, the undead lovers have buried Richard up to his neck on the beach. They have since disappeared together into the surf, leaving Richard's own seaweed-covered video camera to record his coming demise. As the approaching tide proceeds to drown him, the hysterical Richard screams that he can hold his breath "for a LONG time!"

"The Crate"
Mike Latimer, a janitor at Horlicks University, drops a quarter he was flipping which rolls behind a grate under a basement staircase. While attempting to retrieve the coin, he comes across a wooden storage crate marked "Ship to Horlicks University via Julia Carpenter - Arctic Expedition - June 19, 1834" hidden underneath the staircase. He calls Professor Dexter Stanley to notify him of the discovery, drawing Dexter away from a faculty social gathering. Also at the gathering are Dexter's best friend, the mild-mannered Professor Henry Northrup, and Henry's perpetually drunk, obnoxious, and emotionally-abusive wife Wilma "Billie", who has a penchant for embarrassing herself, belittling her husband, and annoying or insulting everybody she meets. Henry regularly fantasizes about killing his horrific wife, but is far too timid to actually go through with it.

Stanley meets Mike at Amberson Hall, where the former discovers the crate. Both men move the crate into a nearby biology lab, where they tirelessly work to get it open. In the process, Mike sticks his hand inside the crate and begins yelling in pain. The crate opens to reveal its contents: a shaggy, ape-like creature with sharp fangs. Despite its diminutive size, the creature promptly kills and devours Mike whole, leaving behind only his mangled boot. Fleeing the lab, Dexter bumps into graduate student Charlie Gereson, to whom he frantically relays what happened. While skeptical, Charlie agrees to investigate the professor's claims. The two find the lab covered in blood, with no sign of the creature or its crate. They discover that the crate has been moved back under the stairs, where they also discover Mike's boot. Wanting to measure the bite marks on the boot, Charlie examines the crate closer. The creature pounces on Charlie and kills him, prompting Dexter to escape and take the boot with him.

Traumatized and hysterical, Dexter runs to Henry's house after Billie leaves for the evening. He tells Henry everything that happened since the crate was discovered, and insists that the monster must be disposed of somehow. Seeing the supposed creature as an ideal way to rid himself of his wife, Henry appears to believe Dexter's story. To this end, Henry spikes Dexter's drink with sleeping pills and writes a note stating that Dexter had supposedly assaulted a female student. This brings Billie rushing to Amberson Hall, where Henry has since cleaned up the bloody lab. When Billie arrives, Henry lures her under the basement stairs, trying to awaken the creature. As Billie rants at Henry for dragging her out there in the middle of the night and assaulting her, the beast awakens and proceeds to consume her.

The next morning, Henry tells Dexter that he secured the beast inside its crate, and then dumped the crate into a nearby quarry, watching as it sank to the bottom. He convinces Dexter that the creature has drowned, and both men agree to let the authorities handle the disappearances. Unknown to Henry and Dexter, the beast is shown to still be alive, and is last seen tearing the submerged crate apart.

"They're Creeping Up on You!"
Upson Pratt is a ruthlessly cruel business mogul who suffers from mysophobia, which has rendered him living in a hermetically-sealed penthouse apartment outfitted with electric locks and surveillance cameras. His apparent contacts with the outside world are through the telephone and are primarily made to put-upon employees. One stormy night, Pratt receives a call from George Gendron, one of his subordinates, about the fact that his company (Pratt International) has recently instigated a corporate takeover of the Pacific Aerodyne company. Gendron also informs Mr. Pratt that the takeover caused a business rival, Norman Castonmeyer, to commit suicide, much to Pratt's delight.

During the call, Pratt slowly begins finding cockroaches around his apartment. Being a fanatical insect hater, Pratt arms himself with bug spray in an attempt to combat the insects. Before long, someone manages to get through on Pratt's private line. The caller turns out to be Norman Castonmeyer's widow Lenore, who tearfully recalls her husband's final moments and curses Pratt for causing his death. After finding pieces of cockroaches in his food processor, Pratt receives a call from his building's superintendent Carl Reynolds, currently on vacation in Orlando. Despite his vacation, Pratt forces Reynolds to send the building's handyman Mr. White to call an exterminator under the threat of firing him.

Soon after, Pratt discovers more cockroaches in a box of cereal, trying and failing to crush any that he can. Mr. White soon arrives outside Pratt's door, and tells him (speaking in a stereotypical minstrel voice to mock him) that he is calling a fumigation service. A rolling blackout then heads towards the building. During the blackout, cockroaches numbering in the hundreds of thousands begin pouring out of every nook and cranny in Pratt's apartment. As the insects overwhelm Pratt, he activates the emergency power and attempts to call the police for assistance. The police are unfortunately unable to be of any help because of the blackout, nor is Mr. White, who is stuck in the elevator.

At his wit's end, Pratt locks himself inside a climate-controlled panic room to escape the growing swarm of cockroaches. He gets to get another call from Lenore, who continues to curse at him. It's during this call that Pratt finds his bedcovers wriggling, and he removes them to discover that the cockroaches have already invaded the panic room. With no way for Pratt to escape, the cockroach swarm charges at him, which induces a fatal heart attack.

When electricity returns to the building, the apartment is utterly devoid of cockroaches. Pratt's corpse is shown in the panic room as Mr. White calls in to report. When he gets no answer, Mr. White mockingly asks Pratt "Bugs got your tongue?" Pratt's body soon begins to contort as cockroaches burst out of his mouth and chest, re-enveloping the panic room. Mr. White continues to call Pratt's name to get a response, then calls him a bastard when he gets no answer.

Epilogue
The next morning, two garbage collectors find the Creepshow comic book on the curb. They look at the ads in the book for X-ray specs and a Charles Atlas bodybuilding course. They also see the advertisement for the voodoo doll that was briefly glimpsed earlier, but lament that the order form has already been redeemed.

Inside the Hopkins house, Stan complains to his wife that he is suffering from a stiff neck, figuring that he must have strained it. Upstairs, Billy is revealed to have sent away for the voodoo doll, and has decorated it with a piece of his father's clothing and some of his hair. Stan clutches his throat in pain as Billy repeatedly and gleefully jabs the voodoo doll with a pin, finally getting revenge on his father for his abuse.

The images of Billy jabbing the doll becomes the cover of the next issue of Creepshow. The Creep is seen holding the same comic book, laughing sinisterly as a candle goes out.

Cast

Wraparound Story
 Joe King as Billy Hopkins
 Tom Atkins (uncredited) as Stan Hopkins
 Iva Jean Saraceni as Billy's Mother
 Marty Schiff as Garbageman #1
 Tom Savini as Garbageman #2

Father's Day
 Carrie Nye as Sylvia Grantham
 Viveca Lindfors as Bedelia Grantham
 Ed Harris as Hank Blaine
 Warner Shook as Richard Grantham
 Elizabeth Regan as Cass Blaine
 Jon Lormer as Nathan Grantham
 John Amplas as Nathan's Corpse
 Nann Mogg as Mrs. Danvers
 Peter Messer as Yarbro

The Lonesome Death of Jordy Verrill
 Stephen King as Jordy Verrill
 Bingo O'Malley as Jordy's Father/Doctor

Something to Tide You Over
 Leslie Nielsen as Richard Vickers
 Ted Danson as Harry Wentworth
 Gaylen Ross as Becky Vickers
 Richard Gere (uncredited) as Man On TV

The Crate
 Hal Holbrook as Henry Northup
 Adrienne Barbeau as Wilma "Billie" Northup
 Fritz Weaver as Dexter Stanley
 Robert Harper as Charlie Gereson
 Don Keefer as Mike the Janitor
 Christine Forrest as Tabitha Raymond
 Chuck Aber as Richard Raymond
 Cletus Anderson as Host 
 Katie Karlovitz as Maid
 Darryl Ferrucci (uncredited) as Fluffy

They're Creeping Up on You
 E. G. Marshall as Upson Pratt
 David Early as Mr. White
 Mark Tierno (uncredited) as the voice of Carl Reynolds
 Ann Muffly (uncredited) as the voice of Lenora Castonmeyer
 Ned Beatty (uncredited) as the voice of Bob Bean

Production
[[Image:Styleexamplescreepshow.jpg|thumb|right|200px|Several screenshots from the film, demonstrating the way comic-book imagery and effects were used extensively by director George A. Romero to recreate the feel of classic 1950s EC horror comics, such as Tales from the Crypt]]"Father's Day", "Something to Tide You Over" and "They're Creeping Up on You!" are original stories by King written for the film. "The Lonesome Death of Jordy Verrill" is based on King's short story "Weeds" and "The Crate" is based on the short story of the same name.

In keeping with Romero's tradition of filming in and around the Pittsburgh area, most of the film was shot in an empty all-girls school located outside Greensburg, Pennsylvania. The school was converted into a film studio, and the episodes "The Lonesome Death of Jordy Verrill" and "They're Creeping Up on You", as well as the prologue and epilogue, were filmed in their entirety at the former school. Filming took place at the Greensburg location throughout 1981.

Several additional locations were also used for filming: 
 "The Crate" — most of the interior and exterior shots for the university sequences were filmed at Carnegie-Mellon University (Romero is a Carnegie-Mellon University alumnus), with Margaret Morrison Hall serving as Amberson Hall. The backyard party was filmed in Romero's own backyard at his former residence on Amberson Avenue in Shadyside, Pennsylvania.
 "Father's Day" was filmed on location at a mansion in the Pittsburgh suburb of Fox Chapel, Pennsylvania.
 "Something to Tide You Over" was filmed on location at Island Beach State Park, Berkeley Township, New Jersey.

In a 2015 interview with The A.V. Club, Ted Danson explained the brief shot of his character drowning underwater: "So they make a little aquarium tank. I got in a wetsuit and climbed in, and somebody would reach down with an oxygen tank ventilator thingy, and I'd breathe, and then they'd take that out. And there was a yoke made out of... I don't know, wood and fake sand, so it looked like my head was buried in the sand, underwater."

Ray Mendez, an entomologist with the American Museum of Natural History, and David Brody provided 20,000 cockroaches for the segment "They're Creeping Up on You". In the final scene of the segment—in which the room is almost filled with cockroaches—many of the apparent insects were actually nuts and raisins, as specified by Tom Savini.

Release Creepshow was given a wide release by Warner Bros. on Wednesday, November 10, 1982. In its opening weekend, Creepshow grossed $5,870,889 from 1,127 theatres, ranking number 1 at the U.S. box office, replacing First Blood in the top spot, and had a five-day total of $8,003,017. In total it grossed $21,028,755 in the United States and Canada, making it the highest grossing horror film for the Warner Bros. studio that year.

Reception
Rotten Tomatoes gave the film a 65% approval rating based on 74 reviews; the average rating is 6.2/10. The site's consensus reads: "It's uneven, as anthologies often are, but Creepshow is colorful, frequently funny, and treats its inspirations with infectious reverence." Roger Ebert gave the film three out of four stars and wrote, "Romero and King have approached this movie with humor and affection, as well as with an appreciation of the macabre". In his review for The New York Times, Vincent Canby wrote, "The best things about Creepshow are its carefully simulated comic-book tackiness and the gusto with which some good actors assume silly positions. Horror film purists may object to the levity even though failed, as a lot of it is". Gary Arnold, in his review for The Washington Post, wrote, "What one confronts in Creepshow is five consistently stale, derivative horror vignettes of various lengths and defects". In his review for The Globe and Mail, Jay Scott wrote, "The Romero-King collaboration has softened both the horror and the cynicism, but not by enough to betray the sources — Creepshow is almost as funny and as horrible as the filmmakers would clearly love it to be". David Ansen, in his review for Newsweek, wrote, "For anyone over 12 there's not much pleasure to be had watching two masters of horror deliberately working beneath themselves. Creepshow is a faux-naif horror film: too arch to be truly scary, too elemental to succeed as satire". In his review for Time, Richard Corliss wrote, "But the treatment manages to be both perfunctory and languid; the jolts can be predicted by any ten-year-old with a stopwatch. Only the story in which Evil Plutocrat E.G. Marshall is eaten alive by cockroaches mixes giggles and grue in the right measure".Bravo awarded it the 99th spot on their "The 100 Scariest Movie Moments", mostly for the scene with the cockroaches bursting out of Upson Pratt's body.

Home media
The film was first released in 1983 on VHS and CED Videodisc.

In the United States, Warner Bros. released a one-disc set on October 26, 1999, with the only extra feature being the film's trailer. No other special features have ever been released with the Region 1 version. The Region 1 DVD was a two-sided disc. One side was the 1.85:1 transfer (widescreen) version of the film and the other side was the full-screen version,

A two-disc Special Edition DVD of Creepshow was released on October 22, 2007, in the UK. The discs feature a brand new widescreen transfer of the film sourced from the original master, a making-of documentary running 90 minutes (titled Just Desserts: The Making of Creepshow), behind-the-scenes footage, rare deleted scenes, galleries, a commentary track with director George A. Romero and make-up effects artist, Tom Savini, and more. The owner of Red Shirt Pictures, Michael Felsher is responsible for the special edition, the documentary and audio commentary in particular.

On September 8, 2009, the film was released on Blu-ray. Again the only special feature is the film's trailer. Scream Factory re-released the film on Blu-ray with new special features (along with most of the ones from the UK release) on October 23, 2018. This release is sourced from a brand new 4K scan of the original camera negative, despite the fact there was some criticism with the 5.1 audio track having been pitched too high and having sync issues (the included stereo track however has no issues).

Second Sight acquired the license to release a new Blu-ray in the United Kingdom. It contains all of the special features included in the special two-disc edition which was released in 2007. It also contains a new audio commentary with Director of Photography Michael Gornick, Actor John Amplas, Property Master Bruce Alan Green and make-up effects assistant Darryl Ferrucci.

Soundtrack

Legacy, sequels, and adaptations
The film was adapted into an actual comic book of the same name soon after the film's release. Bernie Wrightson, known for his work on Heavy Metal and Warren magazines, and fittingly influenced by the 1950s E.C. Comics, did the artwork and is also the uncredited writer of the comic.Tales from the Darkside was the television spin-off.  Due to Warner Bros holding certain rights including the name Creepshow, the title was changed.

A sequel, Creepshow 2, was released in 1987, and was once again based on Stephen King short stories, with a screenplay from Creepshow director George A. Romero. The film contained only three tales of horror (due to budget constraints) as opposed to the original's five stories.

Another sequel, Creepshow 3, featuring no involvement from Stephen King, George A. Romero, or anyone else involved in the production of the first two films, was released direct-to-video in 2007 (though it was finished in 2006) to mostly negative reviews. This film, in a fashion similar to the original Creepshow, features five short, darkly comedic horror stories.

Taurus Entertainment (rights holders of the original Creepshow) licensed the rights to Jace Hall, of HDFILMS, a Burbank, California company, to produce Creepshow: RAW, a web series based upon the original film. The pilot episode for Creepshow: RAW was wrapped on July 30, 2008. The pilot was directed by Wilmer Valderrama and features Michael Madsen. No other episodes have been produced.

Another Creepshow television series was announced in July 2018, which was produced by Greg Nicotero and streamed on Shudder. Each episode of the series consisted of two stories. On January 16, 2019, it was announced that one of the segments of the pilot episode will be based on Stephen King's short story, "Survivor Type" from his 1985 collection, Skeleton Crew. Adrienne Barbeau will return in a new role, and Tobin Bell will contribute a role. On July 19, 2019, it was announced that the series will premiere on September 26, 2019. The series spawned a tie-in novel from Scholastic Books entitled Creepshow: The Taker, featuring two novellas inspired from the show. A follow-up novel is scheduled for release in April 2021, entitled Creepshow: The Cursed, also featuring two novellas inspired by the show. On October 30, 2019, the series was renewed for a second season, which premiered on April 1, 2021. On February 18, 2021, the series was renewed for a third season.

On August 3, 2019, Universal Destinations & Experiences announced that Creepshow'' would be coming to Halloween Horror Nights exclusively at its Universal Studios Hollywood theme park. The maze featured three segments from the 1982 movie as well as two others from the newly made web television version for Shudder.

References

External links

 
 
 
 
 

1980s American films

1980s English-language films
1980s comedy horror films
1980s monster movies
1982 films
1982 horror films
Alien invasions in films
American comedy horror films
American films with live action and animation
American ghost films
American horror anthology films
American monster movies
American natural horror films
American science fiction horror films
American supernatural horror films
Filicide in fiction
Films adapted into comics
Films based on multiple works
Films based on short fiction
Films based on works by Stephen King
Films directed by George A. Romero
Films set in Pittsburgh
Films shot in New Jersey
Films shot in Pittsburgh
Films with screenplays by Stephen King
Patricide in fiction
Uxoricide in fiction
Warner Bros. films